Senator Worley may refer to:

Anna Lee Keys Worley (1876–1961), Tennessee State Senate
Ed Worley (born 1956), Kentucky State Senate
William G. Worley (fl. 1890s), West Virginia State Senate